Johns Hopkins Aramco Healthcare is a joint project between Saudi Aramco, energy and integrated global petrochemicals company, and Johns Hopkins School of Medicine, the academic medical teaching and research arm of Johns Hopkins University.  It is intended to provide healthcare for the employees of Saudi Aramco and their families.  It is jointly owned by the company and the university.

References

Medical and health organisations based in Saudi Arabia